Kalev Ermits (born 19 September 1992) is an Estonian former biathlete and cross-country skier. He competed in biathlon at the 2014 Winter Olympics in Sochi, in the individual contest. He represented Estonia at the 2018 Winter Olympics. He is married to Estonian biathlete Regina Oja.

He competed for Estonia at the 2018 Winter Olympics and the 2022 Winter Olympics.

Biathlon results
All results are sourced from the International Biathlon Union.

World Championships
0 medals

*During Olympic seasons competitions are only held for those events not included in the Olympic program.
**The single mixed relay was added as an event in 2019.

References

External links
 

1992 births
Living people
Estonian male biathletes
Estonian male cross-country skiers
Biathletes at the 2014 Winter Olympics
Biathletes at the 2018 Winter Olympics
Biathletes at the 2022 Winter Olympics
Olympic biathletes of Estonia
21st-century Estonian people